The women's 400 metres hurdles event at the 1996 World Junior Championships in Athletics was held in Sydney, Australia, at International Athletic Centre on 22 and 23 August.

Medalists

Results

Final
23 August

Heats
22 August

Heat 1

Heat 2

Heat 3

Participation
According to an unofficial count, 21 athletes from 18 countries participated in the event.

References

400 metres hurdles
400 metres hurdles at the World Athletics U20 Championships